Every King a Bastard Son is the debut solo album by American musician Rozz Williams, formerly of deathrock band Christian Death. It was released on October 16, 1992. It was described by reviewer Benjamin Harper as "alternatingly demonic, melancholic and tragic." He described "The Evil Ones" as a track "of special note". Authors for alternative music magazine Trouser Press described the album's lyrics as "the most hair-raising poetry likely to be encountered outside a satanic cult read-in", calling the album a "deliberately horrific creation" featuring "sickening" sound effects.

Track listing

Personnel
Donato Canzonieri - Arrangement, bass, guitar and album text
Erik Christides - Artwork and cover design
Ace Farren Ford - Arrangement, cello and musette
Wayne James - Engineering and mixing
Paris Sadonis - Arrangement and keyboards
Rozz Williams - Arrangement, artwork, collage, keyboards, vocals, production and slide guitar

References
Every King a Bastard Son. Allmusic. Accessed March 28, 2013.

1992 debut albums
Rozz Williams albums
Spoken word albums by American artists
Cleopatra Records albums